Emil Nanu (born 17 October 1981) is a Romanian former professional footballer.

External links
 
 

1981 births
Living people
People from Tulcea
Romanian footballers
Association football forwards
Liga I players
Liga II players
FCM Dunărea Galați players
FC Delta Dobrogea Tulcea players
FCV Farul Constanța players
AFC Săgeata Năvodari players
AFC Unirea Slobozia players